Graz is composed of 17 districts, which, like Vienna, are numbered for the sake of convenience although they all have their own names. Legally, they are not really districts, but rather Katastralgemeinden.